Alex Hill may refer to:
 Alex Hill (musician) (1906–1937), American jazz pianist
 Alex Kedoh Hill (born 1990), lacrosse player
 Alex Hyndman (born 1978), or Alexandra Hill, British broadcast journalist

See also
 Al Hill (disambiguation)
 Alexander Hill (disambiguation)
 Alexandra Hill (disambiguation)
 Alex Hills (born 1974), English composer of contemporary classical music
 Hill (surname)